Pork cutlet may refer to:

 Tonkatsu, a Japanese breaded pork cutlet
 Dongaseu, a Korean breaded pork cutlet
 Kotlet schabowy, a Polish breaded pork cutlet

See also
 pork
 cutlet